The men's 500 metres races of the 2013–14 ISU Speed Skating World Cup 1, arranged in the Olympic Oval, in Calgary, Alberta, Canada, were held on 8 and 10 November 2013.

Race one was won by Ronald Mulder of the Netherlands, while Mo Tae-bum of South Korea came second, and Jamie Gregg of Canada came third.

Tucker Fredricks of the United States won Division B of race one, and was thus, under the rules, automatically promoted to Division A for race two. He then went on to win race two, with Mo again finishing second, and Mulder and Gregg sharing third place. Denis Koval of Russia won Division B of race two.

Race 1
Race one took place on Friday, 8 November, with Division A scheduled in the morning session, at 11:25, and Division B scheduled in the afternoon session, at 14:55.

Division A

Division B

Race 2
Race two took place on Sunday, 10 November, with Division A scheduled in the morning session, at 11:00, and Division B scheduled in the afternoon session, at 15:20.

Division A

Division B

References

Men 0500
1